Wakka Dam  is an earthfill dam located in Hokkaido Prefecture in Japan. The dam is used for irrigation. The catchment area of the dam is 3.4 km2. The dam impounds about 10  ha of land when full and can store 881 thousand cubic meters of water. The construction of the dam was completed in 1925.

References

Dams in Hokkaido